Chenar (also Romanized as Chenār; also known as Chinār) is a village in Howmeh-ye Shomali Rural District, in the Central District of Eslamabad-e Gharb County, Kermanshah Province, Iran. At the 2006 census, its population was 233, in 54 families.

References 

Populated places in Eslamabad-e Gharb County